In mathematics, a finitary relation over sets  is a subset of the Cartesian product ; that is, it is a set of n-tuples  consisting of elements xi in Xi. Typically, the relation describes a possible connection between the elements of an n-tuple. For example, the relation "x is divisible by y and z" consists of the set of 3-tuples such that when substituted to x, y and z, respectively, make the sentence true.

The non-negative integer n giving the number of "places" in the relation is called the arity, adicity or degree of the relation. A relation with n "places" is variously called an n-ary relation, an n-adic relation or a relation of degree n. Relations with a finite number of places are called finitary relations (or simply relations if the context is clear). It is also possible to generalize the concept to infinitary relations with infinite sequences.

0-ary relations count only two members: the one that always holds, and the one that never holds. This is because there is only one 0-tuple, the empty tuple. They are sometimes useful for constructing the base case of an induction argument.

Unary relations can be viewed as a collection of members (such as the collection of Nobel laureates) having some property (such as that of having been awarded the Nobel prize).

Binary relations are the most commonly studied form of finitary relations. When X1 = X2 it is called a homogeneous relation, for example:
 Equality and inequality, denoted by signs such as = and < in statements such as "", or 
 Divisibility, denoted by the sign | in statements such as "13|143".
Otherwise it is a heterogeneous relation, for example:
 Set membership, denoted by the sign ∈ in statements such as "".

Example 
Consider the ternary relation R "x thinks that y likes z" over the set of people }, defined by:
 }.

R can be represented equivalently by the following table:

Here, each row represents a triple of R, that is it makes a statement of the form "x thinks that y likes z". For instance, the first row states that "Alice thinks that Bob likes Denise". All rows are distinct. The ordering of rows is insignificant but the ordering of columns is significant.

The above table is also a simple example of a relational database, a field with theory rooted in relational algebra and applications in data management. Computer scientists, logicians, and mathematicians, however, tend to have different conceptions what a general relation is, and what it is consisted of. For example, databases are designed to deal with empirical data, which is by definition finite, whereas in mathematics, relations with infinite arity (i.e., infinitary relation) are also considered.

Definitions 

The first definition of relations encountered in mathematics is:

 Definition 1 An n-ary relation R over sets  is a subset of the Cartesian product .

The second definition of relations makes use of an idiom that is common in mathematics, stipulating that "such and such is an n-tuple" in order to ensure that such and such a mathematical object is determined by the specification of mathematical objects with n elements. In the case of a relation R over n sets, there are  things to specify, namely, the n sets plus a subset of their Cartesian product. In the idiom, this is expressed by saying that R is a -tuple.

 Definition 2 An n-ary relation R over sets  is an -tuple  where G is a subset of the Cartesian product  called the graph of R.

As a rule, whatever definition best fits the application at hand will be chosen for that purpose, and if it ever becomes necessary to distinguish between the two definitions, then an entity satisfying the second definition may be called an embedded or included relation.

The following considerations apply under either definition:
 The set Xi is called the th domain of R. Under the first definition, the relation does not uniquely determine a given sequence of domains. In the case where R is a binary relation, X1 is also called simply the domain or set of departure of R, and X2 is also called the codomain or set of destination of R.
 When the elements of Xi are relations, Xi is called a nonsimple domain of R.
 When the th domain of definition of R is equal to Xi, R is said to be total on Xi. In the case where R is a binary relation, when R is total on X1, it is also said to be left-total or serial, and when R is total on X2, it is also said to be right-total or surjective.
 When all Xi are the same set X, it is simpler to refer to R as an n-ary relation over X, called a homogeneous relation. Otherwise R is called a heterogeneous relation.
 When any of Xi is empty, the defining Cartesian product is empty, and the only relation over such a sequence of domains is the empty relation . Hence it is commonly stipulated that all of the domains be nonempty.

The characteristic function of R, denoted by χR, is the Boolean-valued function , defined by  if  and  otherwise.

In applied mathematics, computer science and statistics, it is common to refer to a Boolean-valued function as an n-ary predicate. From the more abstract viewpoint of formal logic and model theory, the relation R constitutes a logical model or a relational structure, that serves as one of many possible interpretations of some n-ary predicate symbol.

Because relations arise in many scientific disciplines, as well as in many branches of mathematics and logic, there is considerable variation in terminology. Aside from the set-theoretic extension of a relational concept or term, the term "relation" can also be used to refer to the corresponding logical entity, either the logical comprehension, which is the totality of intensions or abstract properties shared by all elements in the relation, or else the symbols denoting these elements and intensions. Further, some writers of the latter persuasion introduce terms with more concrete connotations (such as "relational structure" for the set-theoretic extension of a given relational concept).

History 

The logician Augustus De Morgan, in work published around 1860, was the first to articulate the notion of relation in anything like its present sense. He also stated the first formal results in the theory of relations (on De Morgan and relations, see Merrill 1990).

Charles Peirce, Gottlob Frege, Georg Cantor, Richard Dedekind and others advanced the theory of relations. Many of their ideas, especially on relations called orders, were summarized in The Principles of Mathematics (1903) where Bertrand Russell made free use of these results.

In 1970, Edgar Codd proposed a relational model for databases, thus anticipating the development of data base management systems.

See also 

 Incidence structure
 Hypergraph
 Logic of relatives
 Logical matrix
 Partial order
 Predicate (mathematical logic)
 Projection (set theory)
 Reflexive relation
 Relation algebra
 Relational algebra
 Relational model
 Relations (philosophy)

References

Bibliography 
 
 Bourbaki, N. (1994) Elements of the History of Mathematics, John Meldrum, trans. Springer-Verlag.
 Carnap, Rudolf (1958) Introduction to Symbolic Logic with Applications. Dover Publications.
 Halmos, P.R. (1960) Naive Set Theory. Princeton NJ: D. Van Nostrand Company.
 Lawvere, F.W., and R. Rosebrugh (2003) Sets for Mathematics, Cambridge Univ. Press.
 Lewis, C.I. (1918) A Survey of Symbolic Logic, Chapter 3: Applications of the Boole—Schröder Algebra, via Internet Archive
 Lucas, J. R. (1999) Conceptual Roots of Mathematics. Routledge.
 Maddux, R.D. (2006) Relation Algebras, vol. 150 in "Studies in Logic and the Foundations of Mathematics". Elsevier Science.
 Merrill, Dan D. (1990) Augustus De Morgan and the logic of relations. Kluwer.
 Peirce, C.S. (1870), "Description of a Notation for the Logic of Relatives, Resulting from an Amplification of the Conceptions of Boole's Calculus of Logic", Memoirs of the American Academy of Arts and Sciences 9, 317–78, 1870. Reprinted, Collected Papers CP 3.45–149, Chronological Edition CE 2, 359–429.
 Peirce, C.S. (1984) Writings of Charles S. Peirce: A Chronological Edition, Volume 2, 1867-1871. Peirce Edition Project, eds. Indiana University Press.
 Russell, Bertrand (1903/1938) The Principles of Mathematics, 2nd ed. Cambridge Univ. Press.
 Suppes, Patrick (1960/1972) Axiomatic Set Theory. Dover Publications.
 Tarski, A. (1956/1983) Logic, Semantics, Metamathematics, Papers from 1923 to 1938, J.H. Woodger, trans. 1st edition, Oxford University Press. 2nd edition, J. Corcoran, ed. Indianapolis IN: Hackett Publishing.
 Ulam, S.M. and Bednarek, A.R. (1990), "On the Theory of Relational Structures and Schemata for Parallel Computation", pp. 477–508 in A.R. Bednarek and Françoise Ulam (eds.), Analogies Between Analogies: The Mathematical Reports of S.M. Ulam and His Los Alamos Collaborators, University of California Press, Berkeley, CA.
 Ulam, S.M. (1990) Analogies Between Analogies: The Mathematical Reports of S.M. Ulam and His Los Alamos Collaborators in A.R. Bednarek and Françoise Ulam, eds., University of California Press.
 Roland Fraïssé (2000) [1986] Theory of Relations, North Holland

Mathematical logic
Mathematical relations